Comet is a pinball machine released by Williams in June 1985. It was designed by Barry Oursler, who was inspired by the Comet roller coaster at Riverview Park in Chicago, and was the first in an amusement park themed pinball trilogy followed by Cyclone in 1988 and Hurricane in 1991.

Rules
In this pinball game, the player attempts to navigate throughout a representation of a Carnival, with the namesake Comet being a central ramp representing a roller coaster, normally worth 10,000 points. Two banks of Shooting Gallery targets (Rabbits and Ducks) can be targeted to score points and advance the matching bonus counter.  Each bonus track is worth a maximum of 63,000 points. Hitting all four targets in a target bank lights an additional objective, which allows the player to collect the matching bonus during play by completing the Whirlwind ramp (for Ducks) or the Funhouse saucer (for Rabbits).  Completing both target banks lights additional points for the center ramp (30,000, 50,000, 100,000, and one more 100,000 per sequential shot), including the chance for extra balls and replays depending on specific game settings.  Completing the ramp advances both bonuses.

The most definitive feature of Comet is a Motorcycle Jump ramp on the upper-right side of the playfield.  This features a Skee ball-like scoring setup, where the closest target is worth 20,000, the middle target is worth 50,000, and the farthest target is worth 200,000. Completing the ramp advances both bonuses. The ramp starts each ball in a lit state, then becomes unlit after being scored.

Comet features a relatively unique flipper area arrangement. On the right side, there is no inlane and on the left side, the inlane and outlane are inverted. What would normally be an inlane on a conventional pinball machine instead causes the ball to drain.  The left inlane relights the Motorcycle Jump ramp, and the two outlanes advance the bonus.

Next to the central Comet ramp is a drop target that reveals the Dunk The Dummy target. Once the drop target is hit, the dummy will taunt the player using voice sounds (Hey Turkey!, Hit me, Turkey!).  Hitting the Dunk The Dummy target will increase the bonus multiplier by one step (2x, 3x, 5x).

At the top of the playfield is a set of four rollover targets that spell out 1-9-8-6. Completing these four targets will activate a playfield point multiplier for a limited time.  By default this is a 2x multiplier, but is 3x on the second ball, and 5x on the final ball (i.e. "2x, 3x, 5x" in three-ball play and "2x, 3x, 2x, 2x, 5x" in five-ball play).  Comet provides the ability to cycle the already lit targets towards the right by activating the right flipper, using the Lane Change feature.

If the 5x playfield multiplier is lit at the same time as the Motorcycle Jump ramp is lit, a voice will announce "One Million!" and additional playfield lights will highlight the Motorcycle Jump ramp. Completing the longest jump at this time will award one million points (200,000 times 5x).  Comet was the first solid-state machine to feature a one million point shot.

See also
Cyclone - a pinball machine by Williams released in 1988 featuring an amusement park theme
Funhouse - another pinball machine by Williams released in 1990 featuring an amusement park theme

References

External links

Williams pinball machines
1985 pinball machines